Philip of Nevers may refer to:

 Philip I, Count of Nevers the Bold (1342-1402), also Duke of Burgundy
 Philip II, Count of Nevers (1389-1415)